The 2014 Patna Pirates season statistics for the contact team sport of kabaddi are here.

Points Table

Playoff Stage
All matches played at Sardar Vallabhbhai Patel Indoor Stadium, Mumbai.

See also
Kabaddi in India
Punjabi Kabaddi

References

Patna Pirates